P11 may refer to:

Aircraft 
 Curtiss P-11 Hawk, a fighter aircraft of the United States Army Air Corps
 Lippisch P.11, a German bomber project
 Piaggio P.11, an Italian-built trainer
 PZL P.11, a fighter aircraft used by the Polish Air Force

Pistols 
 Heckler & Koch P11, an underwater pistol
 Heckler & Koch HK4, a pistol used by the German military as the "P11"
 Kel-Tec P-11, a semi-automatic pistol

Science
 p11 protein
 Pioneer 11, a space probe
 Pseudomonas sRNA P11, a gene of the pathogen Pseudomonas aeruginosa

Surface vehicles 
 Infiniti G20 (P11), a compact executive car
 Nissan Primera (P11), a family car
 Norton P11, a motorcycle

Other uses 
 Kwekwe-Gokwe Highway, in Zimbabwe
 Ndengereko language
 , a patrol boat of the Namibian Navy
 Painters Eleven, a Canadian artist group
 Papyrus 11, a biblical manuscript

See also
 11P (disambiguation)